Craig Matthew Nall (born April 21, 1979) is a former American football quarterback who was drafted by the Green Bay Packers of the National Football League (NFL) in the fifth round of the 2002 NFL Draft. He played college football for LSU and Northwestern State. He also played for the Buffalo Bills and Houston Texans; he also had brief stints with the Scottish Claymores of NFL Europe and the Florida Tuskers of the United Football League (UFL).

Early years
Nall was born in Alexandria, Louisiana, and attended Alexandria Senior High School, where he was the quarterback for the football team, having thrown for 5,038 yards and 38 touchdowns.

College career

LSU
Nall initially played college football at Louisiana State University.  He was redshirted in 1997.  In 1998, he was the #2 quarterback behind senior Herb Tyler. When Tyler suffered an injury late in the game at Notre Dame, Nall came off of the bench to lead LSU the length of the field in a furious comeback attempt. The comeback came up short as an LSU receiver dropped the potential game winning pass in the end zone on fourth down as time was winding down. Nall then started the next week in the last game of the season at #13 Arkansas. Nall was sacked six times and threw for 147 yards and was intercepted once.

In 1999, Nall had to battle Josh Booty and Rohan Davey for the quarterback position. Nall was named the starter for the season opener but was benched at halftime with LSU leading. He was sacked once for 8 yards and he threw two interceptions in 15 attempts (completing 6 of 15 for 79 yards). Nall made only one other brief appearance at quarterback for LSU in 1999 as he got some late mop-up duty the next week. Nall did not play quarterback for the rest of the season.

Nall only got two passing attempts in the 2000 season opener after a groin injury hampered him at the end of fall camp.

Northwestern State
In 2001, Nall transferred to Northwestern State University in Natchitoches, Louisiana, where he became the first quarterback in school history to surpass two thousand yards passing in a season.

Professional career

Green Bay Packers
He was drafted out of NSU by the Green Bay Packers in the fifth round of the 2002 NFL Draft with the 164th choice overall. Nall also started for the Scottish Claymores of NFL Europe in 2003 and was the league's leading passer. In 2004 Nall played in five games as Brett Favre's backup at Green Bay. He completed 23 of 33 passes for 314 yards and four touchdowns, with no interceptions, and a passer rating of 139.4.

Buffalo Bills
In 2006, Craig Nall signed as an unrestricted free agent with the Buffalo Bills, where he competed for the starting quarterback position until a hamstring injury suffered on the second day of practice ended his involvement in the competition. In 2007, he fell on the team's depth chart behind J. P. Losman and Trent Edwards. At the end of pre-season, he was cut from the team's final roster. Early into the regular season he was re-signed by the Bills but was released shortly thereafter.

Houston Texans
On October 29, 2007, Nall was signed by the Houston Texans as insurance when starter Matt Schaub was hurt against San Diego. He was released by the Texans on November 21, 2007.

Green Bay Packers (second stint)
He signed a one-year deal with the Packers on December 1, 2007, after they released Marviel Underwood. He became a free agent in the 2008 offseason.

Houston Texans (second stint)
Nall was re-signed by the Houston Texans on November 5, 2008 after an injury to Matt Schaub. He was waived on December 17 when the team signed fellow Northwestern State alumnus cornerback David Pittman.

Florida Tuskers
Nall was signed by the Florida Tuskers of the United Football League on August 25, 2009.

References

External links
Green Bay Packers bio
Houston Texans bio

1979 births
Living people
Sportspeople from Alexandria, Louisiana
Players of American football from Louisiana
American football quarterbacks
LSU Tigers football players
Northwestern State Demons football players
Green Bay Packers players
Scottish Claymores players
Buffalo Bills players
Houston Texans players
Florida Tuskers players